The 6"/53 caliber gun (spoken "six-inch-fifty-three-caliber") formed the main battery of some United States Navy light cruisers and three US submarines built during the 1920s.

Description
United States naval gun terminology indicates the gun fired a projectile 6 inches (15 cm) in diameter, and the barrel was 53 calibers long (barrel length is 6 inch x 53 = 318 inches or 8 meters.)  The gun with side swing Welin breech block and Smith-Asbury mechanism weighed about 10 tonnes and used a silk bag containing 44-pounds (20 kg) of smokeless powder to give a 105-pound (47.6 kg) projectile a velocity of 3000 feet per second (900 m/s).  Early Marks were built-up guns with a liner, tube, full-length jacket, and 2 hoops; but the Mark 14 gun was of monobloc construction.  Useful life expectancy was 700 effective full charges (EFC) per liner.

Mark 13 casemate mounting
These guns were installed as the primary battery on the s, and were intended for the secondary battery of the never-completed s and South Dakota-class battleships.

Mark 16 turret mounting
This two-gun turret was a design modification to improve the range and broadside of the Omaha-class cruisers.

Mark 17 wet mounting

Surviving examples
The ship was present at the attack on Pearl Harbor and the guns were most likely on board at the time.

See also

Weapons of comparable role, performance and era
 BL 6 inch Mk XXII naval gun : roughly equivalent British gun deployed on battleships
 152 mm /53 Italian naval gun Models 1926 and 1929 : Italian equivalent

References

Sources

External links

 

World War II naval weapons
Naval guns of the United States
152 mm artillery
Military equipment introduced in the 1920s